This is a list of Richard Branson's business ventures from the 1960s to today.

1960s 
 1966 – After failed attempts to grow and sell both Christmas trees and budgerigars, Branson launches his first successful business, a magazine named Student, the first issue of which appearing in January 1968. Branson's net worth was estimated at £50,000 by 1969.

1970s 
 1970 – Start selling records by mail-order
 1971 – Opens his first record shop on Oxford Street
 1972 – Opens a Virgin Recording Studio
 1973 – Launches Virgin Records record label 
 1979 – Buys the gay nightclub Heaven, located under Charing Cross railway station. It was sold in 2003 to a private buyer. Branson's net worth was estimated at £5 million by 1979.

1980s 
 1980 – Virgin Records goes international
 1981 – Virgin buys the Kensington Roof Gardens
 1983 – Virgin Vision, later to become Virgin Communications, is formed to distribute films and videos in the television and broadcasting sector.
 1983 – Virgin Games is launched.
 1984 – Virgin Atlantic and Virgin Cargo are launched.
 1984 – Virgin Vision (launched the previous year) launches "Music Box", a 24-hour satellite music station.
 1985 – Virgin Group now includes record labels, retail outlets, exported music publishing, broadcasting, satellite television, and film and video distribution.
 1985 – Branson starts Virgin Holidays
 1987 – Branson takes Virgin Records to the United States
 1987 – The Virgin Group, along with Granada, Anglia and Pearson, founds British Satellite Broadcasting and receives a UK licence to broadcast five new TV channels by satellite in the UK.
 1987 – Virgin sets up 525, a post production facility in Los Angeles, to work on high-end commercials and pop videos.
 1987 – Virgin sets up "Music Box" as an independent producer of music programmes.
 1987 – Virgin buys a 45% stake in Mastertronic Group. Later Virgin Mastertronic becomes a wholly owned subsidiary of Virgin Group, creating, marketing and distributing computer games software and Sega consoles in several European countries.
 1987 – Virgin buys Rushes Postproduction in London.
 1987 – Virgin launches Virgin Airship & Balloon Company.
 1987 – Richard Branson launched Mates condoms in the UK to promote condoms to young adults
 1988 – Virgin re-opens the recently acquired and re-modeled Olympic Studios in Barnes, London.
 1988 – Virgin launches Virgin Classics, another Virgin international record label specializing in high-quality classical music.
 1988 – Virgin sells some of its smaller UK retail stores and puts more money into Virgin Megastores, opening new stores both in the UK and abroad.
 1988 – Virgin sets up Virgin Broadcasting.
 1988 – Virgin sells its shareholding in British Satellite Broadcasting.

1990s 
 1990 – Virgin arrives in Japan
 1991 – Virgin Publishing (Virgin Books) is formed
 1992 – Virgin Records is sold to Thorn EMI
 1993 - Virgin Vision is bought by PolyGram for $5.6 million
 1993 – Virgin Radio hits the airwaves with Virgin 1215AM
 1994 – Launch of Virgin Vodka and Virgin Cola
 1995 - Discretely invests in AirTicketsDirect
 1995 – Virgin Direct Personal Financial Services opens for business
 1995 – Virgin Express a European low cost Airline is launched in Brussels after the purchase and rebranding of EBA Express
 1996 – V2 Music is created
 1996 – Virgin.Net launches
 1996 – Virgin Brides launches
 1996 – Virgin Group becomes majority shareholders in London Broncos rugby league team
 1997 – Virgin CrossCountry and Virgin Trains West Coast commence operations
 1997 – Majority shareholding in Virgin Radio is sold to Chris Evans
 1997 – Virgin Cosmetics launches
 1998 – 49% stake in Virgin Rail Group sold to Stagecoach Group
 1999 – Virgin Mobile launches Virgin's first telecoms venture
 1999 – Virgin Active Launches in South Africa, UK and Italy
 1999 – Majority shareholding in London Broncos is sold to David Hughes
 1999 – 49% shareholding in Virgin Atlantic sold to Singapore Airlines

2000s 
 2000 – Virgin launches Australian airline Virgin Blue (now called Virgin Australia)
 2000 – Virgin sells Rushes Postproduction to Ascent Media – then Liberty Livewire
 2000 – Virgin launches Virgin Energy
 2000 – Virgin launches Virgin Cars
 2002 - Virgin Interactive Espania SA splits from Virgin Interactive and re-brands as Virgin Play
 2004 – Virgin launches Virgin Galactic
 2005 – Virgin Express merges with Sn Brussels Airlines to form Brussels Airlines. Virgin retains minority share.
 2005 – Virgin Active UK acquires Holmes Place
 2006 – Virgin announces Virgin Fuel, a new company to produce a clean fuel in the future
 2006 – Virgin Active Spain is Launched
 2007 – Virgin Active Portugal is Launched
 2007 – Virgin launches Virgin Health Bank
 2007 – Virgin launches Virgin Media
 2007 – Virgin launches Virgin America
 2007 – Virgin buys 20% stakes in AirAsia X
 2007 – Sells Virgin Megastore in the UK and Ireland to Zavvi
 2007 – Virgin Media Television Launches Virgin 1
 2007 – Closes Virgin Digital in the UK (Virgin now sells music downloads through Virgin Media's website)
 2007 – Virgin Fuel US$400 million in Virgin Atlantic jet flight on biofuels and in renewable energy.
 2007 – Virgin Money becomes preferred bidder for acquisition of Northern Rock (and is eventually successful).
 2007 – Virgin Radio Italia launches in Italy in joint venture with Finelco.
 2007 – Virgin CrossCountry ceases after franchise lost to Arriva CrossCountry
 2008 – Virgin Australia Airlines offers competitive prices between Australia and Los Angeles. Known as V Australia due to naming rights.
 2008 – Virgin launches Virgin Healthcare
 2009 – Virgin launches Virgin Money Giving

2010s 
2010 – Virgin launches Virgin Racing, a Formula One team previously known as Manor Grand Prix
 2010 – Virgin launches Virgin Gaming, a service for people of all skill levels to play competitively on popular Video Games.
 2010 – Virgin launches Virgin Produced, a film and television development, packaging and production company based in Los Angeles, California.
 2010 – Virgin launches Project, a digital magazine created exclusively for Apple Inc's iPad.
 2010 – Virgin Money buys Church House Trust
 2012 – Virgin Money buys Northern Rock
 2012 – Virgin Galactic announces the development of orbital space launch system LauncherOne.
 2013 – Virgin Media sold to Liberty Global
 2015 – Virgin Trains East Coast commences operating the InterCity East Coast franchise, Virgin Group hold a 10% shareholding
 2016 – Virgin launches Virgin Voyages; Virgin Radio Jakarta launches in May 2016, replacing Ninety Niners FM. The station was owned by MPG Media
 2017 – Virgin invested in Hyperloop One; Branson joined its board of directors, and in December 2017 became its chairman.
 2018 – Virgin invests in Brightline trains in Florida, USA. The system is briefly named Virgin Trains USA.
 2018 – Virgin Trains East Coast ceases trading
 2019 - Virgin purchases Flybe through the consortium Connect Airways, Flybe is subsequently renamed Virgin Connect.
 2019 - Virgin Trains West Coast ceases after InterCity West Coast franchise lost to Avanti West Coast

References

External links 
 Virgin Corporate Website
 virginbrand.com Unofficial blog of the Virgin Group
 International Rescue Corps
 Gonzo Way of Branding Fast Company magazine article on Sir Richard Branson
 Fédération Aéronautique Internationale (FAI)
 International Ballooning Commission (CIA) notable flights
 Svenska Ballongfederationen, Pacific ocean flights
 Profile on BBC News dated September 27, 2004
 Mates History "Richard Branson launched Mates condoms in the UK in 1987 to promote condoms to young adults"
 Video Interview on CBC News: The Hour dated November 21, 2005
 AskMen.com feature on Richard Branson – includes pics, pictures, biography, video, related news, vital stats, and commentary.

Business-related lists
Virgin Group